Claudius Aelianus (Greek transliteration Kláudios Ailianós; c. 175c. 235 AD), commonly Aelian, born at Praeneste, was a Roman author and teacher of rhetoric who flourished under Septimius Severus and probably outlived Elagabalus, who died in 222. He spoke Greek so fluently that he was called "honey-tongued"; Roman-born, he preferred Greek authors, and wrote in a slightly archaizing Greek himself.

His two chief works are valuable for the numerous quotations from the works of earlier authors, which are otherwise lost, and for the surprising lore, which offers unexpected glimpses into the Greco-Roman world-view. It is also the only Greco-Roman work to mention Gilgamesh.

De Natura Animalium
Some are included for the moral lessons they convey; others because they are astonishing.

The Loeb Classical Library introduction characterizes the book as "an appealing collection of facts and fables about the animal kingdom that invites the reader to ponder contrasts between human and animal behavior".

Aelian's anecdotes on animals rarely depend on direct observation: they are almost entirely taken from written sources, not only Pliny the Elder, Theopompus, and Lycus of Rhegium, but also other authors and works now lost, to whom he is thus a valuable witness. He is more attentive to marine life than might be expected, though, and this seems to reflect first-hand personal interest; he often quotes "fishermen". At times he strikes the modern reader as thoroughly credulous, but at others he specifically states that he is merely reporting what is told by others, and even that he does not believe them. Aelian's work is one of the sources of medieval natural history and of the bestiaries of the Middle Ages.

The surviving portions of the text are badly mangled and garbled and replete with later interpolations. Conrad Gessner (or Gesner), the Swiss scientist and natural historian of the Renaissance, made a Latin translation of Aelian's work, to give it a wider European audience. An English translation by A. F. Scholfield has been published in the Loeb Classical Library, 3 vols. (1958-59).

Varia Historia

Various History—for the most part preserved only in an abridged form—is Aelian's other well-known work, a miscellany of anecdotes and biographical sketches, lists, pithy maxims, and descriptions of natural wonders and strange local customs, in 14 books, with many surprises for the cultural historian and the mythographer, anecdotes about the famous Greek philosophers, poets, historians, and playwrights and myths instructively retold. The emphasis is on various moralizing tales about heroes and rulers, athletes and wise men; reports about food and drink, different styles in dress or lovers, local habits in giving gifts or entertainments, or in religious beliefs and death customs; and comments on Greek painting. Aelian gives accounts of, among other things, fly fishing using lures of red wool and feathers, lacquerwork, and serpent worship. Essentially, the Various History is a classical "magazine" in the original sense of that word. He is not perfectly trustworthy in details, and his writing was heavily influenced by Stoic opinions, perhaps so that his readers will not feel guilty, but Jane Ellen Harrison found survivals of archaic rites mentioned by Aelian very illuminating in her Prolegomena to the Study of Greek Religion (1903, 1922).

Varia Historia was first printed in 1545. The standard modern text is that of Mervin R. Dilts (1974).

Two English translations of the Various History, by Fleming (1576) and Stanley (1665) made Aelian's miscellany available to English readers, but after 1665 no English translation appeared, until three English translations appeared almost simultaneously: James G. DeVoto, Claudius Aelianus: Ποικίλης Ἱστορίας (Varia Historia) Chicago, 1995; Diane Ostrom Johnson, An English Translation of Claudius Aelianus' "Varia Historia", 1997; and N. G. Wilson, Aelian: Historical Miscellany in the Loeb Classical Library.

Other works
Considerable fragments of two other works, On Providence and Divine Manifestations, are preserved in the early medieval encyclopedia, the Suda. Twenty "letters from a farmer" after the manner of Alciphron are also attributed to him. The letters are invented compositions to a fictitious correspondent, which are a device for vignettes of agricultural and rural life, set in Attica, though mellifluous Aelian once boasted that he had never been outside Italy, never been aboard a ship (which is at variance, though, with his own statement, de Natura Animalium XI.40, that he had seen the bull Serapis with his own eyes). Thus conclusions about actual agriculture in the Letters are as likely to evoke Latium as Attica. The fragments have been edited in 1998 by D. Domingo-Foraste, but are not available in English. The Letters are available in the Loeb Classical Library, translated by Allen Rogers Benner and Francis H. Fobes (1949).

See also
Historiae animalium by Gessner

References

Further reading
Aelian, On Animals. 3 volumes. Translated by A. F. Scholfield. 1958–9. Loeb Classical Library.
Aelian, Historical Miscellany. Translated by Nigel G. Wilson. 1997. Loeb Classical Library. 
Alciphron, Aelian, and Philostratus, The Letters.  Translated by A. R. Benner, F. H. Fobes. 1949. Loeb Classical Library. 
Aelian, On the Nature of Animals. Translated by Gregory McNamee. 2011. Trinity University Press. 
Ailianos, Vermischte Forschung. Greek and German by Kai Brodersen. 2018. Sammlung Tusculum. De Gruyter Berlin & Boston 
Ailianos, Tierleben. Greek and German by Kai Brodersen. 2018. Sammlung Tusculum. De Gruyter Berlin & Boston 2018, 
Claudius Aelianus, Vom Wesen der Tiere - De natura animalium. German and Commentary by Paul-Gerhard Veh, Philipp Stahlhut. 2020. Bibliothek der Griechischen Literaur. Anton Hiersemann Verlag Stuttgart 2020, ISBN

External links

 
 
 Ποικίλη ἱστορία – bibliotheca Augustana
 Raw Greek OCR of Hercher's 1864 Teubner edition of Aelian's works at the Lace repository of Mount Allison University: vol. I, vol. 2 
 Various History at James Eason's site (excerpts in English translation)
 English translation of Aelian's fragments at attalus.org
 Some quotes from Aelian's natural history (English)
 Aelian from the fly-fisherman's point-of-view
 The Evidence for Aelian's Katêgoria tou gunnidos regarding Aelian's presumed invective against Elagabalus

Aelian's Characteristics of Animals

Greek with English translation
Aelian on the Characteristics of Animals, Books I-V (Greek with English translation by A.F. Scholfield, 1950)
Aelian on the Characteristics of Animals, Books VI-XI (Greek with English translation by A.F. Scholfield, 1950)
Aelian on the Characteristics of Animals, Books XII-XVII (Greek with English translation by A.F. Scholfield, 1950)
HTML version of Scholfield's English translation at attalus.org

Latin translation
 De natura animalium at LacusCurtius (complete Latin translation)

Greek
 De natura animalium libri XVII, Varia historia, Epistolae fragmenta, ex recognitione Rudolphi Hercheri, Lipsiae, in aedibus B. G. Teubneri, 1864: vol. 1, vol. 2.
 

175 births
235 deaths
People from Palestrina
Claudii
Ancient Roman rhetoricians
Ancient Greek writers
2nd-century Romans
3rd-century Romans
3rd-century writers
2nd-century Greek people
3rd-century Greek people